The DeBarge family is a family of rhythm and blues artists from Grand Rapids, Michigan.

In 1975, Bobby left Grand Rapids to start the funk-soul band, Switch (Tommy later joined the band), which first went by the moniker, First Class. Eventually signing with Motown Records in 1978, the group's debut album, yielding the hit "There'll Never Be," sold over one million copies and started the DeBarge musical dynasty. 

In 1979, Bunny, Marty, Randy, El and James signed with Motown as the DeBarges and released their debut album two years later under the guidance of Bobby and Tommy, who left Switch that year to begin mentoring their siblings. A year later, in 1982, the group, now known as DeBarge, found fame with the singles, "I Like It" and "All This Love." They would go on to have several more hit singles, such as "Time Will Reveal," "Love Me in a Special Way" and "Rhythm of the Night," reaching R&B superstardom by the mid-1980s. 

Younger brother Chico became a solo success first with his 1986 dance-pop single, "Talk to Me," and then after a stint in prison, with more soulful singles such as "Iggin' Me" and "No Guarantees." El DeBarge also found solo fame in the 1980s with singles such as "Who's Johnny" and "Love Always" and collaborations on hits by Quincy Jones, Tone Loc and Fourplay. Etterlene's youngest son Darrell released his first solo album in 2005 continuing on the DeBarge name as various members continue solo careers.

Family members
Robert Louis DeBarge, Sr. (1932–2009) from Cicero, Illinois, served in the United States Armed forces and was of French and English descent.  Robert DeBarge's grandfather, Arthur DeBarge, immigrated from France.  Robert met Etterlene Abney (born 1935), who is African American, in Detroit, Michigan, in the early 1950s. They married in 1953, at 21 and 17 years old, respectively, settling in a predominantly black section of Detroit, where they had ten children.

In 1972, the DeBarges moved to Grand Rapids, Michigan, where Etterlene's brother, Bishop William Charles Abney, Jr., pastored Bethel Pentecostal Church.  Etterlene divorced Robert DeBarge sometime in 1974 after 21 years of marriage. The children claimed that their father sexually abused several of them, which the father denied.  Etterlene later married a second time, to George Rodriguez, a Puerto Rican, leading to the erroneous rumor that the DeBarge family was half-Hispanic. 

Robert and Etterlene have 10 children:
 Etterlene "Bunny" DeBarge (b.March 15, 1955)
 Robert Louis "Bobby" DeBarge, Jr. (March 5, 1956– August 16, 1995)
 Thomas Keith "Tommy" DeBarge (September 6,1957– October 21, 2021); died of liver and kidney failure; bass guitar player and backup singer for the band Switch
 William Randall "Randy" DeBarge (b.August 6, 1958)
 Mark "Marty" DeBarge (b.June 19, 1959)
 Eldra Patrick "El" DeBarge (b.June 4, 1961)
 James DeBarge (b.August 22, 1963)
 Jonathan Arthur "Chico" DeBarge (b.June 23, 1966)
 Carol "Peaches" DeBarge (b.June 5, 1970); fraternal twin of Darrell.
 Darrell "Young" DeBarge (b.June 5, 1970); fraternal twin of Carol.

Robert and Etterlene have dozens of grandchildren, several of whom are involved in the entertainment industry. They include:
 Bobby DeBarge III., son of the late Bobby DeBarge is an aspiring singer.
 Andrew DeBarge, son of Tommy DeBarge, was born on September 28, 1989 in Grand Rapids, Michigan.  His debut album, Your Place, was released in 2008.
 Adris DeBarge, daughter of El DeBarge. She is an executive assistant for producer Tracey Edmonds.
 Eldra Patrick DeBarge Jr., son of El Debarge. His debut album, Welcome to the Lion's Den, was released in late 2012.
 Kyndall DeBarge Sands, daughter of El DeBarge. She is an actress, singer, and YouTube personality.
 Kristinia DeBarge, daughter of James DeBarge. She is a singer who appeared on 2003's American Juniors followed up with a charting album (Exposed) and single ("Goodbye").
 Cheyanne DeBarge, daughter of Chico DeBarge, is an aspiring actress.

Recording artists and groups within the family

Etterlene DeBarge (Mama)
She has recorded major label releases, Etterlene has recorded gospel material mostly with members of her family with her own independent gospel releases. She is known by the name, "Mama DeBarge" or "Mama D" for short.

Switch (Bobby and Tommy)

Brothers Bobby and Tommy rose to fame in the late 1970s as members of the R&B group Switch, which recorded exclusively for the Motown label. Earlier, Bobby had joined a group as background members for Barry White called White Heat. Tommy was included in Bobby's new band Switch and the group would have success in 1978 with the top ten R&B single, "There'll Never Be". The group's first two albums became million-selling successes and the band's success would influence a generation of self-contained R&B bands such as Tony! Toni! Toné! and Mint Condition.

Bobby DeBarge
In 1981 Bobby and his brother Tommy left Switch, and started to mentor their younger siblings in the group DeBarge. Though he remained a collaborator with his brothers and sister, Bobby struggled with personal problems that ended his career. In 1988, he and Chico were convicted of drug trafficking charges in Michigan. After serving six years, DeBarge discovered he had AIDS and tried recording an album - It's Not Over, his only solo project, was released in 1996 following DeBarge's death from AIDS in 1995 at the age of 39.

DeBarge (Bunny, Randy, Mark, El and James)
Forming in 1979 as The DeBarges, the band originally included four members - Bunny, Randy, Mark and El - moved to Los Angeles and signed with Motown where they went under a two-year training process by Motown's staff before releasing their first album in 1981. With the inclusion of 18-year-old James in early 1982, the group changed their name to DeBarge and released their first million-selling album, All This Love, later that year. From 1982 to 1985, DeBarge released three gold-certified albums and released more than ten hit singles. After disbanding shortly in 1986, a reinvented version of the group now featuring Bobby DeBarge and excluding El and Bunny, released a record in 1988 before disbanding the following year due to Bobby's conviction of drug offenses.

El DeBarge
After leaving DeBarge for a solo career in 1986, El DeBarge had modest success as a solo artist peaking with the hit "Who's Johnny" and finding fame as a featured vocalist on several hip-hop and quiet storm-leaning R&B productions including most prominently "Secret Garden" with Quincy Jones and his cover of Marvin Gaye's "After the Dance" with Fourplay. DeBarge's career was halted in the mid-1990s by personal problems which later resulted in arrests.  This period culminated in 2008 with a conviction on crack cocaine charges after DeBarge violated his probation on a previous drug conviction, resulting in two arrest warrants. DeBarge was released from incarceration in October 2009, declaring himself both clean and a born-again Christian.  He has since returned to his music career and released his first studio album since 1994, Second Chance, on November 30, 2010.

Bunny DeBarge
In 1986, Motown released Bunny's only solo project, In Love, which flopped due to Motown's failure to promote despite the best efforts of her first and only single, "Save The Best For Me". Most known for writing the hits "I Like It" and "A Dream" She now records independently as a gospel artist. She, Randy, James and Bunny's daughter appeared on an episode of Lifechangers to talk about their drug problems.

James DeBarge
Though he hasn't had any solo success since DeBarge's breakup, James is most notable for his personal relationship and short marriage to R&B and pop singer Janet Jackson during the early 1980s. James and Jackson annulled their marriage in 1985 because of James' drug problems and disapproval from Jackson's parents Joseph and Katherine. In 2001,  a song with Won-G Bruny and Traci Bingham called Nothing's Wrong, The music video didn't feature Traci but James has lip-synced both parts of the chorus, his and Traci's.

Chico DeBarge
Chico was 18 when he released his first album in 1985. The first single, "Talk to Me", became a top 40 smash for Chico. Branded as the "new star" of the DeBarge family, his career was interrupted by an arrest on drug trafficking charges with his brother Bobby in 1988. After a six-year prison term, Chico DeBarge was released and returned to music, pioneering a new sound in R&B music called neo soul under the UMG label Kedar Ent. In 1997, he recorded the hit album, Long Time No See. Chico is the only DeBarge to date to have achieved certified Gold album status as a solo artist. In 2009, he detailed his drug addiction on his release, Addiction. Since the release of "Addiction," Chico DeBarge had been sober and touring while recording a new CD. He was arrested in January of 2021 after a relapse. Authorities say he posed as his brother James at the time of arrest.

Kristinia DeBarge
James' daughter Kristinia was 19 when Island Records / Sodapop released her debut album, Exposed, in July 2009.

References

 
African-American families
American families of French ancestry